The Ministry of Finance of Costa Rica is the government ministry of Costa Rica in charge of governing the fiscal policy on public resources, according to the principles of economy, efficiency and effectiveness.

History 

The agency was established on 14 October 1825 by executive decree LV. The name of the ministry was changed as Ministry of Economy and Finance as a result of new objectives and functions. New reorganization took effect in 1966 and caused the ministry to be renamed as Ministry of Finance.

Ministers
Joaquín Bernardo Calvo Rosales, ?-1844-?
Manuel José Carazo Bonilla, ?-1855-?
Rafael García-Escalante Nava, ?-1857-?
Salvador González Ramírez, ?-1872-?
Mauro Fernández Acuña, 1885–?
Rafael Yglesias Castro, 1893–1894
Felipe J. Alvarado, ?-1914-?
Mariano Guardia Carazo, ?-1914-1916-?
Manuel Francisco Jiménez Delgado, ?-1918-?
Enrique Ortiz Rivera, ?-1918-?
Aguilar Bolandi, ?-1919
Carlos Brenes Ortiz, 1919
Enrique Ortiz Rivera, 1919
Franklin Jiménez Delgado, 1919–?
Rafael Huete Sáenz, 1920–1921
Nicolás Chavarría Mora, 1921–?
Tomás Soley Güell, 1923–1928
Juan Rafael Arias Bonilla, ?-1929-1930
Tomás Soley Güell, 1930
Luis Demetrio Tinoco Castro
Everardo Gómez Rojas, ?-1939-?
Alvaro Bonilla Lara, ?-1945-?
Alfredo Hernández Volio, 1949–1953
Jorge Rossi Chavarría, 1953–1956
?, 1956–1957
Raúl Hess Estrada, 1957–1958
Alfredo Hernández Volio, 1958–1959
Jorge Borbón Castro, 1959–1962
Raúl Hess Estrada, 1962–1963
Bernal Jiménez Monge, 1963–1966
Álvaro Hernández Piedra, 1966–1969
Óscar Barahona Streber, 1969–1972
Claudio Alpizar Vargas, 1972–1974
Porfirio Morera Batres, 1974–1977
Federico Vargas Peralta, 1977–1978
Hernán Sáenz Jiménez, 1978–1981
Carlos Muñoz Vega, 1981
Emilio Garnier Borella, 1981–1982
Federico Vargas Peralta, 1982–1984
Porfirio Morera Batres, 1984–1986
Fernando Naranjo Villalobos, 1986–1989
Rodrigo Bolaños Zamora, 1989–1990
Thelmo Vargas Madrigal, 1990–1992
Rodolfo Méndez Mata, 1992–1994
José Rafael Brenes Vega, 1994
Fernando Herrero Acosta, 1994–1996
Francisco de Paula Gutiérrez Gutiérrez, 1996–1998
Leonel Baruch, 1998–2001
Alberto Dent Zeledón, 2001–2002
Jorge Bolaños Rojas, 2002–2003
Alberto Dent Zeledón, 2003–2004
Federico Carrillo Zürcher, 2004–2005
David Fuentes Montero, 2005–2006
Guillermo Zúñiga Chaves, 2006–2009
Jenny Philips Aguilar, 2009–2010
Fernando Herrero Acosta, 2010–2012
Luis Liberman, acting, 2012
Edgar Ayales Esna, 2012–2014
Helio Fallas Venegas, 2014–2018
Rocío Aguilar Montoya, 2018–2019
Rodrigo Chaves Robles, 2019–2020
Elián Villegas Valverde, 2020–

See also
 Central Bank of Costa Rica

References

External links 
 Ministry of Finance

Government of Costa Rica
Costa Rica
1825 establishments in Costa Rica
Organizations established in 1825
Government agencies established in the 1820s
1825 in politics